Robert Scott Alexander "Rob" MacIsaac (born 1962) is the president and CEO of Hamilton Health Sciences, a medical group composed of six unique hospitals and a cancer centre located in Hamilton, Ontario, Canada.

Family and early life 

MacIsaac was born on February 5, 1962, at St. Joseph's Healthcare Hamilton to Rita and Archibald (Arch) MacIsaac. He has two older brothers.

In 1987, MacIsaac severed part of his C5 vertebrae after diving into shallow water while camping. He recovered, but has reduced neck movement.

MacIsaac married Anne Wood and had two daughters: Sarah and Catherine.

Education 

MacIsaac completed his undergraduate degree in Economics at the University of Waterloo in 1984 and received a law degree at the University of Western Ontario in 1987. He was called to the Bar in 1989.

Professional life 

On November 6, 2008, Mohawk College announced MacIsaac as their new President. MacIsaac remained the president of Mohawk College until January 31, 2014, and he assumed his new role as President and CEO of Hamilton Health Sciences on February 1, 2014.

MacIsaac is the former chair of Metrolinx, the provincial planning agency responsible for the Greater Toronto Area and Hamilton.

MacIsaac is a former mayor of Burlington, Ontario. He was first elected to Burlington city council in November 1991. MacIsaac served two terms representing Ward 1 at city and regional councils. In 1997, he was elected Mayor of Burlington and was subsequently acclaimed for two more terms. In March 2006, he did not seek re-election.

On October 12, 2006, Ontario Minister of Transportation Donna Cansfield nominated MacIsaac to be Chair of the Greater Toronto Transportation Authority, which is now known as Metrolinx.

During his term as Mayor of the City of Burlington, MacIsaac became involved in several growth management initiatives for the Greater Golden Horseshoe.

As a member of the Ontario Smart Growth Panel, he chaired the sub-panel responsible for developing a growth management strategy for Central Ontario. This work proved influential in the Province's Places to Grow Plan.

MacIsaac subsequently chaired a Provincial task force that established the founding principles for a permanent greenbelt for the Greater Golden Horseshoe.

MacIsaac is Honorary Chair of the Carpenter Hospice, a residential hospice in Burlington that he helped found while still Mayor. He is on the board of directors of the Canadian Urban Institute (CUI) and Canadian Urban Transportation Association (CUTA).

See also
 List of University of Waterloo people

References 

1962 births
Lawyers in Ontario
Living people
Mayors of Burlington, Ontario
Politicians from Hamilton, Ontario
University of Waterloo alumni
University of Western Ontario alumni
Western Law School alumni
Burlington, Ontario city councillors